Morrison–Campbell House is a historic home located near Harmony, Iredell County, North Carolina.  It was built about 1860 by James E. Morrison. The house was later sold to Columbus Wilford Campbell (1846-1915). It is a two-story, three bay by two bay, Late Greek Revival style frame dwelling.  It has a shallow gable roof, exterior brick end chimneys, and a one-story hip roofed front facade porch.  Also on the property is a contributing log smokehouse built in 1880.

It was added to the National Register of Historic Places in 1980.

References

Houses on the National Register of Historic Places in North Carolina
Greek Revival houses in North Carolina
Houses completed in 1860
Houses in Iredell County, North Carolina
National Register of Historic Places in Iredell County, North Carolina